is a district located in Tokachi Subprefecture, Hokkaido, Japan.  There is a district with the same name in Kamikawa Subprefecture, see Nakagawa (Teshio) District, Hokkaido.

As of 2004, the district has an estimated population of 46,499 and a density of 28.34 persons per km2. The total area is 1,640.88 km2.

Towns
Honbetsu
Ikeda
Makubetsu
Toyokoro

History
1869 - Nakagawa District created as part of Tokachi Province
April 1, 1906 - Part of Tabikorai Village incorporated into Ōtsu Village, Tokachi District
April 1, 1925 - Part of Ikeda Village incorporated into Shihoro Village (now town), Katō District
April 1, 1926 - Part of Makubetsu Village incorporated into Taishō Village, Kasai District
June 1, 1933 - Part of Ikeda Town incorporated into Shihoro Village, Katō District
April 1, 1948 - Part of Makubetsu Town incorporated into Taisho Village and Sarabetsu Village, Kasai District
April 1, 1955 - Nishiashoro Town merged with Ashoro Village, Ashoro District forming Ashoro Town, Ashoro District
April 1, 1955 - Part of Ōtsu Village, Tokaichi District incorporated into Toyokoro Village
February 6, 2006 - the village of Chūrui, from Hiroo District, merged into the town of Makubetsu.

Districts in Hokkaido